The 1899 Latrobe Athletic Association season was their fifth season in existence. The team played only four games this season and finished 4–0. This season, the team's colors changed from orange and maroon to red and blue.

Schedule

Game notes

References

Latrobe Athletic Association
Latrobe Athletic Association seasons